The Men's kata competition in Karate at the 2020 Summer Olympics was held on 6 August 2021 at the Nippon Budokan.

Competition format
Competitors were divided into two pools of 5 or 6, and each took turns to perform two sets of kata in the elimination round. The top-three competitors by average score in each pool advanced to the ranking round, where they performed a third set of kata. The winner of pool A faced the winner of pool B in the gold medal bout. Two bronze medals were awarded in kata events. The runner-up of pool A faced the third-place finisher of pool B in a bronze medal bout, while the runner-up of pool B will face the third-place finisher of pool A in another bronze medal bout.

Schedule 
All times are in local time (UTC+9).

Results

Elimination and ranking rounds
Pool A

Pool B

Bronze medal bouts

Gold medal bout

References

External links
Seeding and competition format
 Complete Results book of Karate Event in Tokyo 2020 Olympic Games 

Karate at the 2020 Summer Olympics
Men's events at the 2020 Summer Olympics